Bernardo Irigoyen (born September 3, 1969) is an Argentine cricketer. He is a right-handed batsman and a right-arm medium-pace bowler who has played for Argentina since 1990. He was born in Buenos Aires.

Irigoyen made his debut in the first match of the 1990 ICC Trophy against Papua New Guinea. Irigoyen scored two ducks from three matches in the competition, though he returned to play in 1994. This time around, Irigoyen played much more impressively, and during this competition, he made the highest batting score of his ICC Trophy career of 43 runs.

His good form was to be repeated in the competition in 1997, as he made the second highest Argentine average of the competition, bettered only by teammate Matias Paterlini, the two shining lights in the Argentine attack in an otherwise unfulfilling ICC Trophy run. Irigoyen went nine years without representing his country, before being recalled in the Argentine squad for two matches during their winless ICC World Cricket League stint in 2006. Irigoyen has played as a lower-middle order batsman throughout over sixteen years representing his country.

External links
Bernando Irigoyen at ESPNCricinfo
Bernardo Irigoyen at Cricket Archive 

1969 births
Argentine cricketers
Living people
Cricketers from Buenos Aires
Argentine people of Basque descent